A constitutional referendum was held in Northern Cyprus on 8 June 1975. The constitution for the new breakaway state  provided for a presidential republic in which the president could serve a maximum of two terms of four years, and for a unicameral parliament of 40 seats. It was approved by 99.39% of voters.

Results

References

1975
1975 referendums
1975 in Northern Cyprus
Constitutional referendums
June 1975 events in Europe